Mount Baker (or ), also known as Koma Kulshan or simply Kulshan, is a  active glacier-covered andesitic stratovolcano in the Cascade Volcanic Arc and the North Cascades of Washington in the United States. Mount Baker has the second-most thermally active crater in the Cascade Range after Mount St. Helens. About  due east of the city of Bellingham, Whatcom County, Mount Baker is the youngest volcano in the Mount Baker volcanic field. While volcanism has persisted here for some 1.5 million years, the current volcanic cone is likely no more than 140,000 years old, and possibly no older than 80–90,000 years. Older volcanic edifices have mostly eroded away due to glaciation.

After Mount Rainier, Mount Baker has the heaviest glacier cover of the Cascade Range volcanoes; the volume of snow and ice on Mount Baker,  is greater than that of all the other Cascades volcanoes (except Rainier) combined.

Mount Baker is the third-highest mountain in Washington and the fifth-highest in the Cascade Range, if Little Tahoma Peak, a subpeak of Mount Rainier, and Shastina, a subpeak of Mount Shasta, are not counted. Located in the Mount Baker Wilderness, it is visible from much of Greater Victoria, Nanaimo, and Greater Vancouver in British Columbia, and to the south, from Seattle (and on clear days Tacoma) in Washington.

The explorer George Vancouver renamed the mountain for 3rd Lieutenant Joseph Baker of HMS Discovery, who saw it on April 30, 1792.

History

Mount Baker was well known to indigenous peoples of the Pacific Northwest. "crater"); Quck Sam-ik ("white mountain"); Kobah ("white sentinel", and Tukullum or Nahcullum (in the language of the unidentified "Koma tribe").

In 1790, Manuel Quimper of the Spanish Navy set sail from Nootka, a temporary settlement on Vancouver Island, with orders to explore the newly discovered Strait of Juan de Fuca. Accompanying Quimper was first-pilot Gonzalo Lopez de Haro, who drew detailed charts during the six-week expedition. Although Quimper's journal of the voyage does not refer to the mountain, one of Haro's manuscript charts includes a sketch of Mount Baker. The Spanish named the snowy volcano , as it reminded them of the white-clad monks of the Carmelite Monastery.

The British explorer George Vancouver left England a year later. His mission was to survey the northwest coast of North America. Vancouver and his crew reached the Pacific Northwest coast in 1792. While anchored in Dungeness Bay on the south shore of the Strait of Juan de Fuca, Joseph Baker made an observation of Mount Baker, which Vancouver recorded in his journal:
Six years later, the official narrative of this voyage was published, including the first printed reference to the mountain. By the mid-1850s, Mount Baker was a well-known feature on the horizon to the explorers and fur traders who traveled in the Puget Sound region. Isaac I. Stevens, the first governor of Washington Territory, wrote about Mount Baker in 1853:

Climbing history

First European ascent
Edmund Thomas Coleman, an Englishman who resided in Victoria, British Columbia, Canada and a veteran of the Alps, made the first attempt to ascend the mountain in 1866. He chose a route via the Skagit River, but was forced to turn back when local Native Americans refused him passage.

Later that same year, Coleman recruited Whatcom County settlers Edward Eldridge, John Bennett, and John Tennant to aid him in his second attempt to scale the mountain. After approaching via the North Fork of the Nooksack River, the party navigated through what is now known as Coleman Glacier and ascended to within several hundred feet of the summit before turning back in the face of an "overhanging cornice of ice" and threatening weather. Coleman later returned to the mountain after two years. At 4:00 pm on August 17, 1868, Coleman, Eldridge, Tennant and two new companions (David Ogilvy and Thomas Stratton) scaled the summit via the Middle Fork Nooksack River, Marmot Ridge, Coleman Glacier, and the north margin of the Roman Wall.

Notable ascents
 1948 North Ridge (AD, AI 2–3, 3700 feet) Fred Beckey, Ralph and Dick Widrig (August 1948)

Geology

The present-day cone of Mount Baker is relatively young; it is perhaps less than 100,000 years old. The volcano sits atop a similar older volcanic cone called Black Buttes, which was active between 500,000 and 300,000 years ago. Much of Mount Baker's earlier geological record eroded away during the last ice age (which culminated 15,000–20,000 years ago), by thick ice sheets that filled the valleys and surrounded the volcano. In the last 14,000 years, the area around the mountain has been largely ice-free, but the mountain itself remains heavily covered with snow and ice.

Isolated ridges of lava and hydrothermally altered rock, especially in the area of Sherman Crater, are exposed between glaciers on the upper flanks of the volcano; the lower flanks are steep and heavily vegetated. Volcanic rocks of Mount Baker and Black Buttes rest on a foundation of non-volcanic rocks.

Deposits recording the last 14,000 years at Mount Baker indicate that Mount Baker has not had highly explosive eruptions like those of other volcanoes in the Cascade Volcanic Arc, such as Mount St. Helens, Glacier Peak, or the Mount Meager massif, nor has it erupted frequently. During this period, four episodes of magmatic eruptive activity have been recently recognized.

Magmatic eruptions have produced tephra, pyroclastic flows, and lava flows from summit vents and the Schriebers Meadow Cone. The most destructive and most frequent events at Mount Baker have been lahars or debris flows and debris avalanches; many, if not most, of these were not related to magmatic eruptions, but may have been induced by magma intrusion, steam eruptions, earthquakes, gravitational instability, or possibly even heavy rainfall.

Eruptive history

Early history
Research beginning in the late 1990s shows that Mount Baker is the youngest of several volcanic centers in the area and one of the youngest volcanoes in the Cascade Range. The pale-colored rocks northeast of the modern volcano mark the site of the ancient (1.15 million years old) Kulshan caldera that collapsed after an enormous ash eruption one million years ago. Subsequently, eruptions in the Mount Baker area have produced cones and lava flows of andesite, the rock that constitutes much of other Cascade Range volcanoes such as Rainier, Adams, and Hood. From about 900,000 years ago to the present, numerous andesitic volcanic centers in the area have come and disappeared through glacial erosion. The largest of these cones is the Black Buttes edifice, active between 500,000 and 300,000 years ago and formerly bigger than today's Mount Baker.

Modern craters and cone

Mount Baker was built from stacks of lava and volcanic breccia prior to the end of the last glacial period, which ended about 15,000 years ago. Two craters are on the mountain. Ice-filled Carmelo Crater is under the summit ice dome. This crater is the source for the last cone-building eruptions
The highest point of Mount Baker, Grant Peak, is on the exposed southeast rim of Carmelo Crater, which is a small pile of andesitic scoria lying on top of a stack of lava flows just below. Carmelo Crater is deeply dissected on its south side by the younger Sherman Crater. This crater is the site of all Holocene eruptive activity.

Lava flows from the summit vent erupted between 30,000 and 10,000 years ago, and during the final stages of edifice construction, blocky pyroclastic flows entered the volcano's southeastern drainages. Today, sulfurous gases reach the surface via two fumarole pathways: Dorr Fumarole, northeast of the summit, and Sherman Crater, south of the summit. Both are sites of hydrothermal alteration, converting lavas to weak, white-to-yellow clays; sulfur is a common mineral around these fumaroles. At Sherman Crater, collapses of this weakened rock generated lahars in the 1840s.

Mazama Park eruptive period: 6,600 years ago
Around 6,600 years ago, a series of discrete events culminated in the largest tephra-producing eruption in postglacial time at Mount Baker. This is the last episode of undoubted magmatic activity preserved in the geologic record. At that time, the Nooksack River is believed to have drained north into the Fraser River; this lahar is unlikely to have reached Bellingham Bay. Next, a small hydrovolcanic eruption occurred at Sherman Crater, triggering a second collapse of the flank just east of the Roman Wall. That collapse also became a lahar that mainly followed the course of the first lahar for at least , and also spilled into tributaries of the Baker River. Finally, an eruption cloud deposited ash as far as  downwind to the northeast and east.

Historical activity

Several eruptions occurred from Sherman Crater during the 19th century; they were witnessed from the Bellingham area. A possible eruption was seen in June 1792 during the Spanish expedition of Dionisio Alcalá Galiano and Cayetano Valdés. Their report read, in part:

In 1843, explorers reported a widespread layer of newly fallen rock fragments "like a snowfall" and that the forest was "on fire for miles around". These fires were unlikely to have been caused by ashfall, however, as charred material is not found with deposits of this fine-grained volcanic ash, which was almost certainly cooled in the atmosphere before falling. Rivers south of the volcano were reportedly clogged with ash, and Native Americans reported that many salmon perished. Reports of flooding on the Skagit River from the eruption are, however, probably greatly exaggerated. A short time later, two collapses of the east side of Sherman Crater produced two lahars, the first and larger of which flowed into the natural Baker Lake, increasing its level by at least . The location of the 19th-century lake is now covered by waters of the modern dam-impounded Baker Lake. Similar but lower-level hydrovolcanic activity at Sherman Crater continued intermittently for several decades afterward. On 26 November 1860, passengers who were traveling by steamer from New Westminster to Victoria reported that Mount Baker was "puffing out large volumes of smoke, which upon breaking, rolled down the snow-covered sides of the mountain, forming a pleasing effect of light and shade."

Activity in the 20th century decreased from the 19th century. Numerous small debris avalanches fell from Sherman Peak and descended the Boulder Glacier; a large one occurred on July 27, 2007. In early March 1975, a dramatic increase in fumarolic activity and snow melt in the Sherman Crater area raised concern that an eruption might be imminent. Heat flow increased more than tenfold. Additional monitoring equipment was installed and several geophysical surveys were conducted to try to detect the movement of magma. If those actions had not been taken, significant avalanches of debris from the Sherman Crater area could have swept directly into the reservoir, triggering a disastrous wave that could have caused human fatalities and damage to the reservoir. Other than the increased heat flow, few anomalies were recorded during the geophysical surveys, nor were any other precursory activities observed that would indicate that magma was moving up into the volcano. Several small lahars formed from material ejected onto the surrounding glaciers and acidic water was discharged into Baker Lake for many months.

Activity gradually declined over the next two years, but stabilized at a higher level than before 1975. The increased level of fumarolic activity has continued at Mount Baker since 1975, but no other changes suggest that magma movement is involved.

Current research at Mount Baker
A considerable amount of research has been done at Mount Baker over the past decade, and it is now among the most-studied of the Cascade volcanoes. Recent and ongoing projects include gravimetric and GPS-based geodetic monitoring, fumarole gas sampling, tephra distribution mapping, new interpretations of the Schriebers Meadow lava flow, and hazards analyses. Mapping of Carmelo and Sherman craters, and interpretations of the eruptive history, continue, as well. The Mount Baker Volcano Research Center maintains an online archive of abstracts of this work, and an extensive references list, as well as photos.

Climate

Glaciers and hydrology

Eleven named glaciers descend from Mount Baker. Two additional glaciers (Hadley Glacier and Sholes Glacier) descend from lower slopes detached from the main glacial mass. The other large glaciers—which have areas greater than —are Roosevelt Glacier, Mazama Glacier, Park Glacier, Boulder Glacier, Easton Glacier, and Deming Glacier. All retreated during the first half of the century, advanced from 1950 to 1975 and have been retreating with increasing rapidity since 1980.

Mount Baker is drained on the north by streams that flow into the North Fork Nooksack River, on the west by the Middle Fork Nooksack River, and on the southeast and east by tributaries of the Baker River. Lake Shannon and Baker Lake are the largest nearby bodies of water, formed by two dams on the Baker River.

U.S. Navy
Two ammunition ships of the United States Navy (traditionally named for volcanoes) have been named after the mountain. The first was USS Mount Baker (AE-4), which was commissioned from 1941 to 1947 and from 1951 to 1969. In 1972, the Navy commissioned USS Mount Baker (AE-34). She was decommissioned in 1996 and placed in service with the Military Sealift Command as USNS Mount Baker (T-AE-34).  She was scrapped in 2012.

References

External links

 Mount Baker Volcano Research Center
 CVO Menu — Mt. Baker
 Terminus behavior of Mount Baker Glaciers
 Mount Baker Scenic Byway (PDF)

 
North American 3000 m summits
Stratovolcanoes of the United States
Mountains of Washington (state)
Volcanoes of Washington (state)
Subduction volcanoes
Cascade Volcanoes
Active volcanoes
North Cascades of Washington (state)
Mountains of Whatcom County, Washington
Mount Baker-Snoqualmie National Forest